Casseus is a Haitian surname. It may refer to:
Frantz Casseus, Haitian guitarist
Gabriel Casseus, American actor and screenwriter
Marlie Casseus, Haitian woman with polyostotic fibrous dysplasia

See also
Cassius (disambiguation)

Surnames of Haitian origin